Jack "Tiny" Lipson  (January 17, 1901 – November 28, 1947) was an American film actor. He appeared in over 85 films between 1927 and 1948.

Career
Lipson played character parts, and was usually uncredited. Due to his rotund, towering figure, Lipson gained the nickname "Tiny" and was usually cast as the "fat guy" in films. He played the role of King Vultan the 1936 serial Flash Gordon. In 1941, he appeared in Never Give a Sucker an Even Break as a Turkish passenger aboard an airplane with W. C. Fields, whose mumbled remarks about the passenger's size prompt the retort, "You a big nose have it!" Two years later, Lipson portrayed a German sailor in the Three Stooges' short Back from the Front, in which he is knocked unconscious and collapses on top of a suffocating Larry Fine. Moe Howard comes to the rescue and quips, "Whoa, a German whale!"

Death
Lipson died of a heart attack on November 28, 1947, aged 46. He is interred at Hollywood Forever Cemetery in Hollywood, California.

Partial filmography

References

External links

1901 births
1947 deaths
American male film actors
Male actors from Denver
20th-century American male actors